Rombro Building is a historic loft building located at Baltimore, Maryland, United States. It is a six-story loft building constructed in 1881, and designed as a double warehouse.  The first floor storefronts feature brick, stone, terra cotta, and cast iron framing and reflects the Queen Anne style in its facade organization and detailing.

Rombro Building was listed on the National Register of Historic Places in 1994.

References

External links
, including photo from 1976, at Maryland Historical Trust

Buildings and structures in Baltimore
Commercial buildings on the National Register of Historic Places in Baltimore
Commercial buildings completed in 1881
Downtown Baltimore
Queen Anne architecture in Maryland
1881 establishments in Maryland